Eileen A. Lacey (1961) is an American biologist who specializes in the evolution of behavioral diversity among vertebrates.  Lacey’s research focuses on identifying ecological causes of sociality and assessing the genetic consequences of sociality in subterranean rodents. She is most known for her research on the social structure of naked mole rats and her arguments regarding the eusociality continuum

Biography 
Lacey spent her undergraduate years at Cornell University where she established her research on mole rats in the laboratory. Lacey then went on to pursue her Masters and Ph.D. (1991) at the University of Michigan. Her doctoral thesis was "Reproductive and dispersal strategies of male arctic ground squirrels (Spermophilus parryii plesius)" ,

Career 
Lacey is currently a Professor of Integrative Biology at the University of California, Berkeley, where she manages the Lacey Lab. The Lacey Lab focuses on vertebrate social behavior and population biology and encompasses a variety of taxa and topics. Eileen Lacey has published findings from her studies in various scientific journals. She is  also the co-editor of a comprehensive work on subterranean rodents, Lacey, Eileen A., James L. Patton, and Guy N. Cameron. Life Underground: The Biology of Subterranean Rodents. Chicago: University of Chicago Press, 2000.

Selected articles 
 Paul W. Sherman,  Eileen A. Lacey,  Hudson K. Reeve,  Laurent Keller, (1995)"Forum: The eusociality continuum Behavioral Ecology," Volume 6, Issue 1, Spring 1995, Pages 102–108, https://doi.org/10.1093/beheco/6.1.102 (open access)
 Lacey, E.A. 2004. Sociality reduces individual direct fitness in a communally breeding rodent, the colonial tuco-tuco (Ctenomys sociabilis). Behavioral Ecology & Sociobiology, in press.
 Lacey, E.A. and J. R. Wieczorek. 2003. The ecology of sociality in rodents: a ctenomyid perspective. Journal of Mammalogy 84:1198-1211.
 Hambuch, T.M. and E.A. Lacey. 2002. Enhanced selection for MHC diversity in social tuco-tucos. Evolution 56:841-845.
 Lacey, E.A. 2001. Microsatellite variation in solitary and social tuco-tucos: molecular properties and population dynamics. Heredity 86:628-637
 Paul W. Sherman,  Eileen A. Lacey,  Hudson K. Reeve,  Laurent Keller, (1995)"Forum: The eusociality continuum Behavioral Ecology," Volume 6, Issue 1, Spring 1995, Pages 102–108, https://doi.org/10.1093/beheco/6.1.102 (open access) According to Google Scholar, it has been cited 361 times.

References 

20th-century American biologists
21st-century American biologists
Living people
1961 births
American women biologists
Cornell University alumni
University of Michigan alumni
20th-century American women scientists
21st-century American women scientists